Vendaval (Gale in English) is a song for the former Banda Calypso. It was their first single.

The song 
The song did not have a national impact, however, it had an impressive impact in Belém and cities of the Northeast. The music was present in the top 3 compilations of the band, Os 20 Super Sucessos, Os Maiores Sucessos and As 20+. It also achieved considerable success in 2001 when it was re-recorded by the band sergipana Calcinha Preta  in their CD volume 7, Seu Coração vai A´render o que é Paixão.

Today 
According to Joelma and Chimbinha, fans request many old songs, such as Vendaval, for new shows. On tour, in Sweden, the band did not take the reportoire of music and made a simple presentation without choreography or effects, simply Joelma and the public.

1999 singles
1999 songs